Pegi or PEGI may refer to:

 Pan European Game Information, a European video game content rating system
 Peninsula Engineering Group, Inc., defunct American telecoms engineering company

People
 Pegi Young (1952–2019), American singer-songwriter and philanthropist
 Pegi Nicol MacLeod, (1904–1949), Canadian painter
 Pegi Vail, American anthropologist and filmmaker
 Predrag Radovanović (1911–1964), Serbian footballer and coach nicknamed "Pegi"
 Ileen Pegi (born 1992), member of the Solomon Islands women's national football team

See also
 Peg (disambiguation)
 Peggy (disambiguation)